John Hampden-Trevor, 3rd Viscount Hampden PC (24 February 1748 – 9 September 1824), was a British diplomat.

He was the younger son of Robert Hampden, 1st Viscount Hampden and was educated at Westminster School and Christ Church, Oxford. He followed in his father's career by becoming a diplomat.  He was Minister to Munich (1780 – 1783) and to Turin (1783 – 1798).

On 8 May 1773, he married Harriet Burton (1751–1829), daughter of the Rev. Daniel Burton. Trevor was appointed to the Privy Council in 1797. He succeeded to the Viscountcy of Hampden on 20 August 1824, just three weeks before his death. He had no heirs, and the title became extinct at that time.

References
William Carr, "Trevor, John Hampden-, third Viscount Hampden (1748–1824)", rev. P. J. Jupp, Oxford Dictionary of National Biography, (Oxford University Press, 2004) , retrieved 22 Sept 2008.

This also uses information gleaned from the GenFam Families Database.

1748 births
1824 deaths
British diplomats
Members of the Privy Council of Great Britain
3